Charles Flint Putnam (1 December 1854 – ) was an officer in the United States Navy.

Biography 
Born in Freeport, Illinois, Putnam entered the United States Naval Academy at the age of 14. Master Putnam was stationed at San Francisco, California, in 1876 and was attached to schoolship  from 1877 to 1878.

In 1879, he joined the Coast Survey steamer  in the North Pacific. When Rodgers burned at Saint Lawrence Bay, Chukotka, on 30 November 1881, Putnam took supplies to the survivors on dog sledges.

On his return to his depot at Cape Serdze, he missed his way in a blinding snow storm 10 January 1882, drifted out to sea on an ice-floe and was never heard from again.

Namesakes 
Three ships have been named  for him.

References 

1854 births
1882 deaths
Jeannette expedition
People from Freeport, Illinois
United States Naval Academy alumni
United States Navy officers
Military personnel from Illinois